Fang Peak is a mountain in southwestern British Columbia, Canada, located  east of Rivers Inlet and  southeast of Mount Fitzgerald.

Fang Peak lies on the eastern rim of a circular volcanic depression in the Pacific Ranges of the Coast Mountains called the Silverthrone Caldera.

References

Two-thousanders of British Columbia
Pacific Ranges
Range 2 Coast Land District